Jeni LeGon (born Jennie Ligon; August 14, 1916 – December 7, 2012), also credited as Jeni Le Gon, was an American dancer, dance instructor, and actress. She was one of the first African-American women to establish a solo career in tap dance.

Early years
Born as Jennie Ligon in Chicago, Illinois, her parents were Hector Ligon, a chef who also worked as a railway porter, and Harriet Bell Ligon, a housewife. She grew up in the Black Belt area of Chicago and finished Sexton Elementary School in 1928. When she was 13, she successfully auditioned for the chorus line of band leader Count Basie. She attended Englewood High School for one year thereafter.

Career 
In 1931, LeGon began performing across the southern United States with the Whitman Sisters company. In 1933, she and her half-sister, Willa Mae Lane, formed the LeGon and Lane  song-and-dance team. They were given the opportunity to go to Detroit and work with nightclub owner Leonard Reed. While there, they received an offer to travel to Hollywood and perform with composer Shelton Brooks. Upon arrival, they discovered there was, in fact, no job. LeGon heard about auditions being held by Ethel Waters' former manager, Earl Dancer. The audition was for a film that Fox Studios was producing. She won the part and subsequently appeared in dance numbers in several musicals.

In 1935, she signed with RKO Pictures to be the dancing partner of Bill Robinson in the film Hooray for Love. She also performed in a 1935 London production of the revue At Home Abroad, taking over numbers that Waters and Eleanor Powell had in the Broadway version.

While in Hollywood, LeGon had the opportunity to work with performers such as Waters and Al Jolson. She danced with Fred Astaire and Bill "Bojangles" Robinson, becoming the first African-American woman to do so on film. MGM signed her to a long-term contract, making LeGon the first African-American woman to receive such an opportunity, but cancellation of the contract soon followed.

On Broadway, LeGon portrayed Jenny in Black Rhythm (1936), and Lily Ann in Early to Bed (1943). In 1947, she played Cab Calloway's treacherous girlfriend Minnie the moocher in a low-budget full-length musical movie with an all-Black cast titled Hi-De-Ho. She danced at a number of clubs and theaters including the Apollo, Cafe de Paris, Howard, Paramount and Lincoln Theaters. In the early 1950s, she appeared on the televised version of Amos 'n' Andy.

LeGon owned and operated the Jeni LeGon Dance Studio in Los Angeles and managed the Drama & Dance Playhouse in Los Angeles. In 1969, she settled in Vancouver, British Columbia, where she taught tap and pointe. In 1999, the National Film Board of Canada released a documentary film about her life, Jeni Le Gon: Living in a Great Big Way, directed by Grant Greshuk and produced by Selwyn Jacob. She appeared in the film Bones (2001).

Personal life 
In 1943, LeGon married composer, conductor, and pianist Phil Moore. They composed the song "The Sping", sung by Lena Horne in the film Panama Hattie.

Recognition and papers
LeGon was inducted into the Black Filmmakers Hall of Fame in 1987  and into the Tap Dance Hall of Fame in 2002. Oklahoma City University awarded her an honorary doctorate in 2002.

LeGon's papers are housed at the Smithsonian Institution.

In popular culture
Zadie Smith's 2016 novel, Swing Time, features two biracial young women who discover LeGon while watching videotapes of old film musicals. When they see her perform in Ali Baba Goes to Town (1937), the character Tracey "sits perched close to the TV, studying her moves, her mouth open in surprise." LeGon becomes an obsession for Tracey.

Filmography

References

External links

 
Listing from The History Makers
Listing from Tap Dance Hall of Fame 

1916 births
2012 deaths
20th-century American actresses
20th-century American singers
20th-century American women singers
African-American actresses
African-American female dancers
Actresses from Chicago
American emigrants to Canada
American expatriates in Canada
American female dancers
American film actresses
American musical theatre actresses
American tap dancers
Dance teachers
Dancers from Illinois
Singers from Chicago